Airway Lanes was a band from Melbourne, Australia. The band released their debut album "In Vino Veritas" in May 2008. Their debut EP Airway Lanes, was released mid-2006.

History
Airway Lanes formed in late 2004 after Dan Hall decided to leave his band Taxiride to refine his songwriting talents over the next few years. He hooked up with fellow musician Chris Hawker and began playing a couple of shows as a duo. Paul 'Spyder' Marret and Glen 'Scrub' Evans filled out the band and they started doing live shows. They soon signed to Indie label 'Dust Devil Music'. They recorded an EP with producer Jimi Maroudas. The band's sound is a guitar-based melodic rock sound with attention to lyrical content.

Airway Lanes released its debut album 'In Vino Veritas'. The first single from the album is 'Don't Let Go' Hall/Hawker.

After a five-year hiatus, Airway Lanes returned to live performing in late 2013.

In 2018/19, the band released their final album 'Light Of Day' as a series of three EP's, between June 2018 and June 2019.

The band played their final performance in June 2018 at MEMO Music Hall in St Kilda, Melbourne.

Members
Airway Lanes:

 Dan Hall – Guitar, piano and vocals
 Chris Hawker – Guitar and vocals
 Scrubby – Bass guitar
 Spyder – Drums and vocals

Discography

EPs

LPs

External links
 Airway Lanes at Myspace
 Airway Lanes at theblurb
 

Australian rock music groups